Niseko is a town located in Shiribeshi Subprefecture, Hokkaido, Japan. To Japanese people, Niseko principally refers to a mountain range and a municipal area. However, overseas the name has come to refer to a wider area of ski resorts encompassing Hokkaido's Mount Yōtei, often referred to as the "Mt. Fuji of Hokkaido", and Annupuri ranges. The name Niseko derives from the Ainu language, and it means "a cliff jutting over a riverbank deep in the mountains". The Niseko town's main industries are agriculture and tourism. The resort itself, Niseko United, is part of the Mountain Collective. Moreover, the town is renowned for its quality powder snow and world-class facilities, including traditional onsen and restaurants.

Town
The total number of visitors during the 2009 winter season was 201,000.

Resort
Niseko is composed of six ski areas, in order of size:
 Niseko Hirafu
 Niseko Village (formerly known as Niseko Higashiyama)
 Niseko Annupuri
 Niseko Hanazono
 Niseko Moiwa
 Niseko Weiss
Park Hyatt

Niseko Mt. Resort Grand Hirafu, refers to the combined areas of Hirafu and Hanazono. Both of these and Weiss are within the municipality of nearby Kutchan. The other three resorts are within the adjacent municipality of Niseko.

Of these six ski areas, the main four (Annupuri, Higashiyama, Hirafu, and Hanazono) are sequentially interconnected and may be skied on one ski pass. The lift systems are owned respectively by the Chuo Bus company, YTL Resorts (which purchased Niseko Village from Citigroup in 2010), Tokyu Corporation and Pacific Century Premium Developments. Together they form  skiable of what is known as the Niseko United. The lift system comprises 38 gondolas and lifts connecting 61 ski runs and 12 terrain parks. Kutchan's sister city is St. Moritz in a relationship established in 1964. Niseko Moiwa, adjacent to Annupuri, can be skied to from Annupuri but is not currently connected by the lift system. Niseko Weiss has not operated its lifts for decades, but people can still ski in this area, being taken uphill by snow cats.

Niseko also has backcountry ski-courses that are unofficially on the maps. To the furthest right of Annupuri lies Sannozaka, an area prone to avalanche but with high quality snow. To the far right of Hirafu lies Higashi One, also prone to avalanche but with challenging backcountry terrain. Near the lower half of Hanazono is a forest route called Strawberry Fields, which is perhaps the most famous run in Niseko. Mount Yōtei is also a popular mountain for backcountry skiing expeditions.

For the first time, in March 2008, Niseko was voted into the world's top 10 ski resorts. Coming in at No. 6 it was the highest ranked of the new entries in the poll.

Originally known primarily for winter sports, Niseko has gradually gained a reputation as a center for a wide variety of summer activities, including golf, tennis, fishing, horseback riding, sea kayaking, white water rafting, trekking, and bicycling.

Niseko has also become well known for its hot springs (onsen), diverse culinary choices, and exceptional whiskeys.

Weather
Because of its northern location, Niseko is fed more by weather fronts that come from Siberia than from Eastern Japan, although all of Japan, especially the west coast of the main island (see Yukiguni), experiences northwest-to-southeast Siberian winds in the winter. The resort is internationally renowned for its consistently good falls of light powder snow and its long ski season which runs from late November until early May. The snow is not as dry as other areas in Hokkaido, but the volume is high, with the average snow depth in March reaching .

Infrastructure and development
Niseko, although a growing area, does lack public and private infrastructure in certain areas. Simple public items such as street lighting and winter footpath clearing are left wanting in comparison to other international ski resorts (though this is common in rural Japan). Private infrastructure includes shopping and retail areas from which both are still in growth phase. These facilities are now available in Shiki building in central Hirafu where there is a supermarket, restaurants, a cafe and tour desk. Significant infrastructure development – initially focused on the road heating and redevelopment of the main street "Hirafu-zaka" – has now been completed as well as removing the overhead power lines and relocating them underground.

Counteracting this lack of infrastructure is the high demand for real estate. Foreign-owned companies are developing in the area along with Japanese companies. Purchase demand has expanded from Australian markets to include Hong Kong, Singapore and mainland China.

Nightlife and accommodation can be found across the district, Niseko Village/Annupuri/Moiwa is home to many of the established hotel properties, such as the Hilton Niseko Village and The Green Leaf Hotel, Northern Resort Annupuri, Hotel Ikoi no mura and Hotel Kanronomori, Grand Hotel and Hotel Ashiri Niseko. In Hanazono the all new Mountain Center was just finished and the extensive Hyat Hotel is near completion. The Hirafu area is home to established and newer hotels as well as much of the district's modern condominium style accommodation, creating an eclectic mix of bars, restaurants, hotels, and lodges. The Japanese dining experiences that can be enjoyed across the district are extremely popular both among domestic and international tourists.

Transportation 
Niseko is located in the southwestern part of Hokkaido. The nearest airport is New Chitose Airport. Japan Rail Hokkaido, taxis, limousines and rental vehicles are some of the options to get to Niseko. The journey from the airport takes around 2 hours and 30 minutes. Niseko has day trips to many of the surrounding areas.

The Hokkaidō Shinkansen (bullet train) linking Kutchan (倶知安) with Tokyo and Sapporo is scheduled to open in March 2031.

Conferences 
Niseko Town completely renovated and reopened its Community Hall as a conference center in January 2012. This modern and well equipped center is located in the center of the town close to local restaurants and the Town Council chambers, local schools and is on a well serviced bus route that connects the town with the surrounding resort areas that make up Niseko. There are a wide range of local businesses that can provide support to your conference and the towns Chamber of Commerce office is located in the Conference center to help facilitate conference needs.

Education 

Hokkaido International School in Niseko is a private, coeducational day school that offers a western-style education from pre-school through 6th grade for students of all nationalities. English is the language of instruction. Hokkaido International School in Niseko was established in 2011 and is a branch of Hokkaido International School in Sapporo. HIS Niseko and HIS Sapporo are the only international schools on the island of Hokkaido.

HIS Niseko offers an elementary international curriculum to its students that prepares them for middle school at the Sapporo School. The Language Arts and Maths Curriculum are developed by the Curriculum Team with input and assistance from the classroom teachers. Science, History, Geography, Society, Technology and the Arts are delivered through The International Primary Curriculum (see the section on Academics). All curriculum is resourced with a variety of materials from England, Australia, the United States and Canada. The thematic standard-based units of the IPC allow for easy integration across the subject areas and differentiated learning opportunities.

See also 

Niseko Mt. Resort Grand Hirafu
Shikotsu-Tōya National Park
Niseko-Shakotan-Otaru Kaigan Quasi-National Park
Hokkaido International School in Niseko

References

External links

Official Website 

Towns in Hokkaido